Sir Alfred Thomas "Turi" Carroll  (24 August 1890 – 11 November 1975) was a New Zealand tribal leader, farmer and local politician. Of Māori descent, he identified with the Ngāti Kahungunu iwi and was a nephew of Sir James Carroll.

He was born in Wairoa, Hawke's Bay, New Zealand on 24 August 1890. He was educated at Wanganui, Te Aute College and Lincoln Agricultural College, then he farmed at Wairoa. He was a Rotarian and prominent in the Anglican Church, and was chairman of the Wairoa County Council. 

He served in the New Zealand Expeditionary Force in World War I from 1917 to 1919.

In the 1952 Queen's Birthday Honours, Carroll was appointed an Officer of the Order of the British Empire, for services to the Māori race. In 1953, he was awarded the Queen Elizabeth II Coronation Medal. In the 1962 Queen's Birthday Honours, he was promoted to Knight Commander of the Order of the British Empire, for services to the Māori people.

References

1890 births
1975 deaths
Māori politicians
New Zealand farmers
Ngāti Kahungunu people
People from Wairoa
New Zealand military personnel of World War I
New Zealand National Party politicians
Unsuccessful candidates in the 1951 New Zealand general election
Unsuccessful candidates in the 1949 New Zealand general election
Local politicians in New Zealand
People educated at Te Aute College
Lincoln University (New Zealand) alumni
Unsuccessful candidates in the 1954 New Zealand general election
New Zealand Knights Commander of the Order of the British Empire